Sudimara Station (SDM) is a class II railway station located in Jombang, Ciputat, South Tangerang. The station, which is located at an altitude of +26 m, is included in the Operation Area I Jakarta, and is located between  Station and  Station.

History 
In order for passenger mobility from Batavia to Rangkasbitung and Banten to run more smoothly, in the 1890s the Staatsspoorwegen company built a railroad line and its stations (including Sudimara Station in 1921) that connected the Duri Station to Rangkasbitung, passing through Tanah Abang. This project was completed in 1899, and regular trains serving the route were immediately started.

Building and layout 
Initially, there were 4 lines at Sudimara Station, with line 2 as a straight track. Lines 2 and 3 were usually used for train traffic and crossings, while line 1 is sometimes used for storing or stabling a series of freight cars, where this 1st line also has a railroad switch (leading to Rawa Buntu) which leads to a dead end or buffer stop. As well as there was also a buffer stop which is a dead end in the station building, its position is to the right of line 1 from the direction of Jurangmangu Station. The two buffer stops were also used to store freight carriages.

It is estimated that in the early 1990s, the rails at Sudimara Station were changed to only 3 lines. Also, the positions of the railroad switches were changed and other lines were dismantled. 

In the early 2000s, Sudimara Station had a total of 3 lines, with line 1 (as a straight track) and line 2 (as a turn track) used for passing and crossing, and line 3 used for overtaking trains. Since the operation of the double track on the Tanah Abang–Serpong railway as of 4 July 2007, the layout of this station has been overhauled by adding line 2 as a new straight line. The old station building which is a legacy of the Staatsspoorwegen is still being maintained and the Train dispatcher room (PPKA) which is also part of the old station building is still in use today.

Because local and regular express train services were removed in 2017, line 3 of Sudimara Station is rarely used because there is no more KRL Commuterline follow-up activity by the train. However, line 3 of Sudimara Station is still occasionally used as a place for storing or stabling Plasser & Theurer, where this maintenance train unit is usually used to maintain the condition of the rails on that line. Also, line 3 of Sudimara Station is also occasionally still used for overtaking KRL by coal trains, the Extraordinary Train (KLB), and sometimes it is also used as a place for storing or stabling KRL train series.

Sudimara station has a pedestrian tunnel, along with the Pondok Ranji Station, so passengers are no longer necessary to directly cross the rail tracks for safety.

Services
The following is a list of train services at the Sudimara Station.
KRL Commuterline

Intermodal support

Incidents

1987 train crash 

On 19 October 1987, there was an extraordinary incident of train collision between the local train numbered 225 Rangkasbitung–Jakarta Kota relation pulled by the BB306 16 locomotive and the Patas train numbered 220 Tanah Abang–Merak relation pulled by the BB303 16 locomotive, this event is also known as the first Bintaro tragedy. The collision incident that killed more than 100 people occurred between Kebayoran Station and Sudimara Station. It is indicated that the crash happened due to of miscomunication and misinformation between Sudimara Station train dispatcher and Kebayoran Lama Station train dispatcher.

Other incidents 

 On 5 December 2021, a KRL JR 205-144F extraordinary train that was about to enter and stabling on line 3 of Sudimara Station (from the direction of Serpong Station) suddenly experienced a derailment after passing the train station and the Sudimara Railway crossing, this incident occurred at 12.30. As a result of this, regular KRL trips were disrupted, and the road at the Sudimara Railway crossing was impassable for vehicles because it was blocked by a series of the derailed KRL train.

References

External links

South Tangerang
Railway stations in Banten
Railway stations opened in 1889